Radamés Eliud Treviño Llanas (7 December 1945 – 12 April 1970) was a Mexican road and track cyclist who won two silver and one bronze medals at the 1967 Pan American Games: in the 100 km team time trial and in the 4 km pursuit, individual and with a team. He competed in these three events at the 1968 Olympics with a best result of fifth place in the individual pursuit.

On 21 October 1967 he rode the individual pursuit world record in a time of 4'49.73" on a velodrome in Mexico. Later in 1969 he set a world hour record.

Treviño died after a crash during a regional race between Pachuca and Mexico City. A velodrome in Mexico is named in his honor.

References

External links
 

1945 births
1970 deaths
Mexican male cyclists
Olympic cyclists of Mexico
Cyclists at the 1968 Summer Olympics
Sportspeople from Monterrey
Pan American Games medalists in cycling
Pan American Games silver medalists for Mexico
Pan American Games bronze medalists for Mexico
Cyclists at the 1967 Pan American Games
Medalists at the 1967 Pan American Games
20th-century Mexican people